Shilandai Station is a station on Line 1 of the Hohhot Metro. It opened on 29 December 2019. Shilandai is the first of three overground stations at Line 1's eastern terminus.

References

Hohhot Metro stations
Railway stations in China opened in 2019